Lancken-Granitz is a municipality in the Vorpommern-Rügen district, in Mecklenburg-Vorpommern, Germany. Near the villages of Lancken and Burtevitz are several megalith tombs from the Neolithic.

The Lancken-Granitz municipality consists of the following villages:
 Lancken-Granitz
 Blieschow
 Burtevitz
 Dummertevitz
 Garftitz
 Gobbin
 Neu Reddevitz
 Preetz (Rügen)
 Zarnekow

References

External links

Official website of 

Rügen